Hyperextension means a movement where extension is performed at any joint beyond its normal range of motion.

A back extension is an exercise that works the lower back as well as the mid and upper back, specifically the Erector spinae. Each of us have two Erector spinae muscles, one of either side of the spine that run along the entire length of the spine. Erector spinae muscles are actually formed of 3 smaller muscles - spinalis, longissimus, and iliocostalis.

The name hyperextensions are being used for back extension exercises that are done using a hyperextension bench in a fitness gym. However the name 'hyperextensions' is a misnomer, because what you are trying to do here is only to extend the spine within its normal range and not beyond its normal range of motion. When you extend the back from the flexed position, at the end range, your head and neck stays in neutral position.

In fact, back extension beyond the normal range of motion has been found to be detrimental for the exerciser. Hyperextensions during dead lift have been found to lead to lumbar disc pathologies and muscular spasms.

Equipment used 

 Without any equipment: It may be performed on the ground by lying prone with arms overhead and lifting the arms, upper torso, and legs as far as possible. Here you use gravity as resistance to strengthen the back extensor muscles. 
 Using a Roman chair: A Roman chair helps to stabilize the legs up until the hip joints while performing low back extension. To perform the exercise, the torso from above the hip joints is flexed forwards and down towards the floor. And to complete the exercise, the person contracts his back muscles (Erector spinae) and raises his torso up till his whole body is in a straight line from his head to heels. Exercises could be more challenging by adding the person hugging weights to his chest. Lighter weights may be used to begin with to prevent straining the back muscles with over-exertion. Hold the weight lower in position, if you are a beginner and then gradually bring it higher, to feel more resistance. Please take note to do this exercise slowly and to not extend the back beyond the normal range of motion as this may lead to low back hyperextension injury. 
Using Hyperextension bench: There are two varieties of Hyperextension bench depending upon the angle that they support your lower body, the 45 degrees and 90 degrees hyperextension bench. The 90 degrees Hyper extension bench is also called Roman chair that we discussed above. Here your body lies horizontally and the person can experience full back range of motion. As compared to the 45 degree Hyper extension bench, where the person would be almost standing and it allows extension only up to partial range of motion. In both the versions of the Hyperextension bench, the person is requested to fold his arms in front of himself or place your hands on the back of your head with the elbows pointing to the sides, while performing the exercise.
Using Reverse Hyperextension machine: This machine has been used to strengthen not only the erector spinae muscle, but also gluteus maximus and part of hamstring muscles (biceps femoris).  When back extension is attempted with this machine, the range of motion at hip was found to be relatively more, while the accompanying stresses at hip and back were found not to relatively less.

See also
Extension (kinesiology)

References

Bodyweight exercises
Strength training
Physical exercise